Donald Grant (30 December 1892 – 8 December 1962) is a former Scotland international rugby union player. Grant played as a Wing.

Rugby Union career

Amateur career

Grant played for London Scottish.

Provincial career

Grant played for the English county team East Midlands.

He played for the Whites Trial side against the Blues Trial side on 21 January 1911, while still with London Scottish, scoring a try in the match in a 26-19 win for the Whites.

International career

Grant played 2 matches for Scotland, both in the Five Nations tournament.

He remains the youngest player to play on the Wing for Scotland. His first start was at the age of 18 years and 36 days.

His debut was against Wales on 4 February 1911 at Inverleith. Wales won the match 32 - 10. The Glasgow Herald noted that Grant as 'the schoolboy member of the team, took a long time to find his feet, and did his best work in Scotland's last despairing rally.'

His final match was against Ireland on 25 February 1911 at Inverleith. Ireland won the match 16 - 10. Grant had a kick at goal in the first half but it went right of the post; and his similar conversion kick in the second half also missed. Nevertheless he combined with Carl Ogilivy to good effect throughout the match.

References

1892 births
1962 deaths
London Scottish F.C. players
Scotland international rugby union players
Scottish rugby union players
Whites Trial players
Rugby union wings